Matiar Rahman Tuku Bangladesh Nationalist Party politician. He was elected a member of parliament from Gaibandha-5 in February 1996.

Career 
Tuku was elected to parliament from Gaibandha-5 as an independent candidate in 15 February 1996 Bangladeshi general election. He was defeated in the 7th Jatiya Sangsad elections on 12 June 1996 as a candidate of Bangladesh Nationalist Party from Gaibandha-5 constituency.

References 

Living people
Year of birth missing (living people)
People from Gaibandha District
Bangladesh Nationalist Party politicians
6th Jatiya Sangsad members